The .450 Marlin is a firearms cartridge designed as a modernized equivalent to the .45-70 cartridge.  It was designed by a joint team of Marlin and Hornady engineers headed by Hornady's Mitch Mittelstaedt, and was released in 2000, with cartridges manufactured by Hornady and rifles manufactured by Marlin, mainly the Model 1895M levergun. The Browning BLR is also now available in .450 Marlin chambering, as is the Ruger No. 1.  Marlin ceased manufacture of the 1895M rifle in 2009.  In October 2022 it was rumored that Ruger Firearms the new owner of Marlin Firearms may be reintroducing the 450 Marlin in their Model 1895 guide gun but this has not been confirmed by Marlin or Ruger.

Design 
While ballistically similar to the .45-70, the .450 Marlin was not developed from the .45-70.  Rather, the .450 Marlin was developed from the wildcat .458×2" American, which was based on the .458 Winchester Magnum.  This places the .450 Marlin in the .458 Winchester family of cartridges, though it is more easily understood as a "modernized" .45-70. It is possible to handload the .45-70 to levels that can destroy older firearms such as the Trapdoor Springfield. The .450 Marlin offers the ballistics of such "hot" .45-70 loads without the risk of chambering in firearms that cannot handle its higher pressure.

The belt has been modified to prevent it from chambering in smaller-bore 7 mm Magnum or .338 Magnum rifles.  The .45-70 and .450 Marlin cannot be cross-chambered, but rifles chambered for the American can be modified to fire the .450 Marlin.

Visually, the case resembles that of the .458 Winchester Magnum with a wider belt. The cartridge is capable of taking any large game animal in North America including large elk, brown bear, and moose.

One potential advantage of the .450 Marlin was its ability to chamber easily in bolt-action rifles, essentially becoming a ".45-70 bolt action" cartridge. This idea, however, was only utilized by one company:  Steyr-Mannlicher.  However, many companies such as E.R. Shaw Inc. and EABCO have helped numerous owners convert their existing bolt-action rifles to .450 Marlin, fulfilling the cartridge's inspired purpose.

Dimensions

The dimensions are subject to change. The most current dimensions are available from the SAAMI website, standard Z299.4 – 2015, at pages 148 and 344.

See also 
11 mm caliber
List of rifle cartridges
Sporting Arms and Ammunition Manufacturers' Institute
Table of handgun and rifle cartridges

References

External links

 .450 Marlin
 450 Marlin Reloading Data
 Whatever Happened To The .450 Marlin?
 Big-Bore Lever-Action Hunting Guns: Pass On Marlins New .450

450 Marlin